Archibald Langley McNeel (20 January 1882 – 22 February 1926) was an Australian rules footballer who played for the Carlton Football Club in the Victorian Football League (VFL).

Notes

External links 
		
Archie McNeel's profile at Blueseum

1882 births
1926 deaths
Australian rules footballers from Victoria (Australia)
Carlton Football Club players